Gudit is the Classical Ethiopic name for a personage also known as Yodit in Tigrinya, and Amharic, but also Isato in Amharic, Akkoo Manooyee in Afaan Oromoo, and Ga'wa in Ţilţal. The personage behind these various alternative names is portrayed as a powerful female ruler, probably identical to Māsobā Wārq, the daughter of the last Aksumite king, Dil Na'ad, mentioned in an early Arabic source. She is said to have been responsible for laying waste the Kingdom of Aksum and its countryside, and the destruction of its churches and monuments. If she is the same as the Tirda' Gābāz in other Ethiopian sources, she is also said to have attempted to exterminate the members of the ruling dynasty.  The deeds attributed to her are recorded in oral tradition and in a variety of historical narratives.

Name
The name "Gudit" in the Ge'ez narrative associates her positively with the Biblical Judith. It has been conjectured that the form Gudit is connected etymologically with the Amharic word gud which connotes a range of meanings from "freak" and "monster" to "strange" and "wonderful". According to Caroline Levi, her alternative name "Isato", aside from meaning "fire", bears a similar set of meanings. The Ţilţal name for her, Ga'wa indicates she came to be associated with a 16th century Muslim queen of that name, something which suggests that the traditions concerning Gudit took centuries to achieve their final form. In one of the Ethiopian kinglists, mention is made of a certain Tirda' Gābāz as the last queen of Aksum. The tales told of her exploits are almost identical with those associated with Māsobā Wārq.

History and stories
Information about Gudit is contradictory and incomplete. Paul B. Henze wrote, "She is said to have killed the emperor, ascended the throne herself, and reigned for 40 years. Accounts of her violent misdeeds are still related among peasants in the north Ethiopian countryside."  Henze continues in a footnote:

There is a tradition that Gudit sacked and burned Debre Damo, an amba which at the time was a treasury and a prison for the male relatives of the king; this may be an echo of the later capture and sack of Amba Geshen by Ahmad ibn Ibrahim al-Ghazi.

However, James Bruce presented a tradition that Dil Na'ad was overthrown by Gudit, and that Mara Takla Haymanot (whom Bruce calls "Takla Haymanot") was a cousin of Gudit who succeeded her after several of her own family.

In oral tradition, Gudit is sometimes conflated with the 16th-century Muslim queen Ga'ewa of Tigray.

Ethnicity
Carlo Conti Rossini first proposed that the account of this warrior queen in the History of the Patriarchs of Alexandria, where she was described as Bani al-Hamwiyah, ought to be read as Bani al-Damutah, and argued that she was ruler of the once-powerful Kingdom of Damot, and that she was related to one of the indigenous Sidama people of southern Ethiopia.

Modern historian Enrico Cerulli discovered Arabic documents that mention a Muslim queen named Badit daughter of Maya in the tenth century who reigned under the Makhzumi dynasty. According to historian Tekeste Negash, Gudit was a Cushitic queen based at Lake Hayq in Wollo Province of Ethiopia. He further explains that there may have been a regional power struggle between Aksum and this queen of Wollo whom had ties to Yemeni traders through the port of Zeila.  Somali folklore also mentions a Harla queen Arawelo, who governed from Zeila into much of the interior of the Eastern Africa.

In more recent perspectives on the issue of the ethnicity of Gudit, there has been less certainty on to her actual identity and yet more certainty on the unlikelihood of her being of Judaic belief or associated with the Beta Israel. According to Steven Kaplan: Despite the Judith legend's popularity and its prominent position in the traditions of both Jews and Christians to this day, there appears to be several good reasons for rejecting the depiction of the tenth century queen of the Bani al-Hamwiyah as a Falasha. Although some Ethiopic sources do portray Yodit as a Jewess, these generally identify her as a convert rather than the product of a well entrenched indigenous religious community. The material recorded by Bruce, which contains the earliest complete account of the legend, must be considered suspect on several grounds...

The suggestion that the Falasha queen Yodit, putative conqueror of Aksum, is in fact the pagan queen of the Sidama, vanquisher of the haḍani is not as startling as it might appear at first glance. By transforming the queen from a pagan to a Jewess and her primary area of activity from the south of Aksum, Christian tradition neatly places her within the primary categories of Ethiopian political-religious discourse. On some levels, the Judith traditions can be said to mirror the themes of the Kebra Nagast. Both the Queen of Sheba and Judith are depicted as converts to Judaism.

Historical evidence
It was during the office of Pope Philotheos of Alexandria when Gudit started her revolt, near the end of the reign of the king who had deposed the Abuna Petros. According to Taddesse Tamrat, "his own death in the conflict, and the military reverses of the kingdom were taken as divine retribution for the sufferings of Abuna Petros."

This chronological synchronicity with the tenure of Patriarch Philotheos, and the intervention of king Georgios II of Makuria, provides us a date of ca. 960 for Gudit. A contemporary Arab historian, Ibn Hawqal, provides this account:

Another historian mentions that the king of Yemen sent a zebra to the ruler of Iraq in 969/970, which he had received as a gift from the Queen of al-Habasha.

In popular culture
Yodit features in the video game Age of Empires II HD: The African Kingdoms. The story is based on a Ge'ez tradition that she was a ruler who was exiled: With her Syrian husband Zānobis, she returns, and rallying people from her homeland in Hahayle, she destroys Aksum, and by decree declares that she had become Jewish and would persecute the Levites.

See also
 Furra, a queen of the Sidama people
 Kingdom of Simien

Notes

Citations

Sources

10th-century Jews
10th-century monarchs in Africa
10th-century women rulers
African women in war
People from the Aksumite Empire
Jewish monarchs
Jewish royalty
Jews and Judaism in Ethiopia
Legendary Ethiopian people
Legendary Jews
Legendary monarchs
Rulers of Ethiopia
Women in 10th-century warfare
Women in medieval warfare
Women rulers in Africa
Medieval Jewish women